Aleksander Aamodt Kilde (born 21 September 1992) is a Norwegian World Cup alpine ski racer. He competes in four events, with a main focus on super-G and downhill.  from Bærum and represents the sports club Lommedalens IL.

Career
Kilde became junior world champion in giant slalom in 2013 at Mont-Sainte-Anne, Quebec, Canada, and won the European Cup overall title that season. He also finished second in the Super-G at the Norwegian national championships, setting a time 0.11 of a second behind winner Aksel Lund Svindal. He made his World Cup debut in October 2012 and has competed on the circuit since the 2014 season.

Kilde represented Norway in the 2014 Winter Olympics in Sochi, Russia, and was 13th in the super-G at Rosa Khutor, but did not finish in the downhill nor the combination, where he placed fourth in the downhill portion of the combined.

He gained his first World Cup podium in a super-G at Val Gardena in December 2015. It was a third place in a Norwegian sweep, following teammates Aksel Lund Svindal and Kjetil Jansrud.

Kilde won the 2019–20 World Cup overall title, after the retirement of Marcel Hirscher with eight consecutive. Despite winning two races in Val Gardena in December 2020, he failed to defend the title due to a season-ending injury in January.

The following 2021/22 season, though, saw Kilde reach a personal best number of podiums within one season: seven wins and two 2nd places. He won the Super-G globe for the second time in his career and also celebrated his first Downhill globe. In the 2022 Winter Olympics, Kilde won two medals, a bronze from Super-G and a surprise silver from alpine combined. He also finished fifth in the downhill.

World Cup results

Season titles

Season standings

^

Race victories
 21 wins – (12 DH, 9 SG) 
 41 podiums – (17 DH, 21 SG, 3 AC)

Podium summary

World Championship results

Olympic results

Personal life
Although his middle name is derived from his mother's maiden name, he is not related to fellow Norwegian alpine racer Kjetil André Aamodt.

Kilde has been in a relationship with American alpine skier and fellow overall World Cup winner Mikaela Shiffrin since early 2021.

References

External links

 
 Aleksander Aamodt Kilde at Atomic Skis
  
 

1992 births
Living people
Norwegian male alpine skiers
Alpine skiers at the 2014 Winter Olympics
Alpine skiers at the 2018 Winter Olympics
Alpine skiers at the 2022 Winter Olympics
Medalists at the 2022 Winter Olympics
Olympic alpine skiers of Norway
Olympic medalists in alpine skiing
Olympic silver medalists for Norway
Olympic bronze medalists for Norway
Sportspeople from Bærum